The Ponale is a  river originating in Lake Ledro (Lago di Ledro) in Trentino, Northern Italy.

The river first passes Molina di Ledro, Prè di Ledro and Biacesa, there feeding a fish farm. Starting from Biacesa the Ponale enters a steep canyon, and after a cascade the Ponale flows into Lake Garda close to Porto del Ponale.

Rivers of Italy
Rivers of Trentino
Rivers of the Province of Brescia